Halim Mersini (born 22 September 1961 in Vlorë) is an Albanian retired football goalkeeper who played for the Albania national team.

Club career
Mersini played for Shkëndija Tiranë, but as an international player had to move to 17 Nëntori Tirana when Shkëndija was relegated and won three league titles with Nëntori.

International career
He made his debut for Albania in an August 1988 friendly match at home against Cuba and earned a total of 6 caps, scoring no goals. His final international was an October 1989 FIFA World Cup qualification match against Sweden.

Personal life
He coached a Kosovar team in Sweden after leaving Albania in the early 1990s and later lived in Bulgaria for 3 years as well as 12 years in Argentina. He returned to Albania in 2010.

Honours
Kategoria Superiore (3): 1985, 1988, 1989
Kupa e Shqipërisë (2): 1984, 1986

References

External links

1961 births
Living people
Footballers from Vlorë
Albanian footballers
Association football goalkeepers
Albania international footballers
Albania under-21 international footballers
Shkëndija Tiranë players
KF Tirana players
Kategoria Superiore players
Albanian expatriate sportspeople in Sweden
Albanian expatriates in Bulgaria
Albanian expatriates in Argentina